The Bemis Park Landmark Heritage District is located in North Omaha, Nebraska. Situated from Cuming Street to Hawthorne Avenue, Glenwood Avenue to 33rd Street, Bemis Park was annexed into Omaha in 1887, and developed from 1889-1922. The district was designated an Omaha Landmark in 1983.

History
George Bemis's Bemis Land Company platted this exclusive subdivision in 1889. His namesake park was part of Omaha's parks and boulevard system, and the neighborhood's tree-lined streets were the first in Omaha to be laid out according to topography rather than the grid pattern used throughout the rest of the city.

The Bemis Park Landmark Heritage District is notable for its mix of late nineteenth and early twentieth century homes. Architecture in Bemis Park includes Queen Anne, Arts and Crafts and Neo-Classical style buildings as well as vernacular structures. The district includes a park donated to the city by the subdivision’s developer George Bemis and designed as a part of the then developing Omaha parks and boulevard system.

The neighborhood was devastated by the Easter Day Tornado of 1913. According to one report, "This beautiful section of Omaha had been completely ruined. The pretty homes that adorned the graceful winding driveways were beyond redemption. The trees had been broken off short at the base, and many of them were even uprooted. One great home had been turned turtle onto the roof of the house adjoining it on the east."

In the 1940s, Bemis Park was home to workers from the new Mutual of Omaha headquarters, teachers at the nearby Tech High School, or employees of the Methodist Hospital.

According to the City of Omaha, the proposed Bemis Park Residential Historic District is eligible for the National Register of Historic Places.

Historic properties

See also
Neighborhoods of Omaha, Nebraska
History of Omaha

External links
Period photos of Bemis Park from the 1913 tornado.
Story of the 1913 tornado's effect on Bemis Park.

References

Neighborhoods in Omaha, Nebraska
History of North Omaha, Nebraska
Historic districts in Omaha, Nebraska
Parks in Omaha, Nebraska
Populated places established in 1889